Funninger Church, in the village of Funningur, is one of the 10 old wooden churches in the Faroe Islands. It was inaugurated on 30 November 1847 and is for that reason the newest of the old traditional wooden churches. Porkeri Church was also inaugurated in 1847 but a few months beforehand. Funningur Church is the only wooden church and the oldest church in the Eiði parish. Until 1929, when the Gjógv Church was inaugurated, it was the parish church for both the villages of Funningur and Gjógv.

The spot where the church stands is called Niðri í Hólma ("down on the islet"). Nowadays the area is no longer like an islet, as the River Stórá runs from the north of the church and flows below it. The river also separates the church from the new cemetery, which was inaugurated in 1941 and expanded in 1972. The church has 10 pews on the men's side and 9 on the women's side. The pulpit is in front of the foremost of the women's pews.

References
James Proctor. Faroe Islands, 3rd ed Bradt Travel Guides, May 13, 2013 pg. 106

Churches in the Faroe Islands
Churches completed in 1847
1847 establishments in the Faroe Islands